In the Hebrew Bible, Gebirah (gəḇīrā; feminine of  , gəḇīr, meaning 'lord') is a title ascribed to queen mothers of Israel and Judah.

Description
Literally translated, the title means 'Great Lady' ("Lady" being the feminine counterpart etymologically to the male honorific "Lord"). However, given that this title is most often attributed to a queen mother, the two have become synonymous, and therefore gəḇīrā is most often translated as 'Queen Mother'. When romanised, gəḇīrā can be used as both a common noun ("a gebirah", "the gebirah") or a proper noun ("the Gebirah"), as with most royal titles. Although not present in the Masoretic Texts, the plural form gəḇīrōṯ is commonly used by academics to avoid the intra-word switching of gebirahs.

The gebirah is believed by some scholars to have held great power as counsel of the king. In 1 Kings 2:20, Solomon said to his Mother Bathsheba, seated on a throne at his right, "Make your request, Mother, for I will not refuse you". The position of the queen mother (gəḇīrā) was a privilege of the highest honour, and was the highest authority for a woman in Israel or Judah. In fact, the only time a woman held higher office was in the case of Athaliah, who held the throne of Judah as queen in her own right, despite being illegitimate in the eyes of the scripture. 

In comparison, gəḇīrā occurs only 6 times. Scholars generally take one of two stances with gəḇereṯ: either classing it as an acceptable variation of the word gəḇīrā within the ketiv (featuring a common qere), or opting for a distinct separation of the two words, despite their converged meanings.

In Christianity
William G. Most, a Catholic author, sees in the gebirah a type of Mary.

References

Further reading

See also
 Asherah
 Queen of Heaven
 Queen of heaven (antiquity)
 Queen mother
 Rulers of Israel and Judah
 Tawananna

Jewish royalty
Ancient Israel and Judah
Queens consort of Israel and Judah